Johann Ludwig Müller (28 June 1892 – 28 June 1972) was a German general (General of the Infantry) in the Wehrmacht during World War II, and a recipient of the Knight's Cross of the Iron Cross with Oak Leaves of Nazi Germany.

Müller, as commander of the XXXXIV Army Corps, surrendered to the Soviet forces in August 1944 and was held in the Soviet Union as a war criminal until 1955.

Awards and decorations 
 Iron Cross (1914) 2nd Class (10 July 1915) & 1st Class (8 April 1918)

 Clasp to the Iron Cross (1939) 2nd Class (21 October 1939) & 1st Class (31 May 1940)
 German Cross in Gold on 28 February 1942 as Oberst im Generalstab in the General Staff of the XXIII. Armeekorps
 Knight's Cross of the Iron Cross with Oak Leaves
 Knight's Cross on 25 October 1943 as Generalleutnant and commander of 97. Jäger Division
 440th Oak Leaves on 6 April 1944 as Generalleutnant and deputy leader of XXIX Armeekorps

References

Citations

Bibliography

1892 births
1972 deaths
Generals of Infantry (Wehrmacht)
German Army personnel of World War I
German prisoners of war in World War II held by the Soviet Union
Military personnel from Rhineland-Palatinate
People from Pirmasens
Recipients of the clasp to the Iron Cross, 1st class
Recipients of the Gold German Cross
Recipients of the Knight's Cross of the Iron Cross with Oak Leaves
Reichswehr personnel
German Army generals of World War II